The decade of the 1340s in art involved some significant events.

Paintings
 1342: Simone Martini – Christ Discovered in the Temple
 1345: Ni Zan – Six Gentlemen
 1348: Bernardo Daddi – Altarpiece of church of San Giorgio a Ruballa, Tuscany
 1349: Zhu Derun – Primordial Chaos

Objects
 1347: Église Notre-Dame de l'Assomption, Bergheim completed
 1348: Gyeongcheonsa Pagoda

Gallery

Births
 c. 1345: Paolo di Giovanni Fei – Italian painter of the Sienese School (died 1411)
 1340: Theophanes the Greek – Byzantine Greek artist, one of the greatest icon painters, or iconographers, of Muscovite Russia (died 1410)
 c. 1340: Niccolò di Pietro Gerini – Italian painter of the late Gothic period (died 1414)
 1340: Claus Sluter – Dutch sculptor (died 1405)

Deaths
 1349: Ugolino di Nerio – Italian painter most active in Siena (born 1280)
 1348: Ambrogio Lorenzetti – Italian painter of the Sienese school. plague (born 1290)
 1348: Pietro Lorenzetti – Italian painter, plague (died 1280)
 1348: Bernardo Daddi – Italian painter, apprentice of Giotto, plague (died 1280)
 1347: Andrea Pisano – Italian sculptor and architect (born 1290)
 1344: Simone Martini – Italian painter born in Siena (born 1284)
 1343: Ke Jiusi – Chinese landscape painter, calligrapher and poet during the Yuan dynasty (born 1290)

 
Years of the 14th century in art
Art